All In with Chris Hayes is an American news television program that airs weekdays at 8:00 p.m. ET on MSNBC. It is hosted by Chris Hayes, who previously hosted Up with Chris Hayes on MSNBC weekends. The show premiered on April 1, 2013.

Similar to Up, the show's format consists of "long-form panel discussions in which the participants talk through several issues." The opening night had 859,000 total viewers, including 298,000 in the ages 25–54 demographic.

All In won its first Emmy Award in 2015 at the 36th annual News & Documentary Emmy Awards in the Outstanding News Discussion and Analysis category.

On August 23, 2019, All In began experimenting with a series of three, Friday-night editions presented in front of a live studio audience in Studio 6-A.

Guest hosts for the series include Mehdi Hasan, Ayman Mohyeldin and Alicia Menendez.

References

External links
 
 
 All In with Chris Hayes on TV.com

2013 American television series debuts
2010s American television news shows
2020s American television news shows
MSNBC original programming
Liberalism in the United States